BRS-inequality is the short name for Bruss-Robertson-Steele inequality. This inequality gives a convenient upper bound for the expected maximum number of non-negative random variables one can sum up without exceeding a given upper bound .

Let  be the maximum number of  one can select in  such that their sum does not exceed .  is a random variable, so what can one say about bounds for its expectation? How would an upper bound for  behave, if one changes the size  of the sample and keeps  fixed, or alternatively, if one keeps  fixed but varies ? In all generality, what can one say if each  may have its own continuous distribution function ?

General problem
Let  be a sequence of non-negative random variables (possibly dependent) that are jointly continuously distributed. For  and  let  be the maximum number of observations among  that one can sum up without exceeding .

Now, to obtain  one may think of looking at the list of all observations, first select the smallest one, then add the second smallest, then the third and so on, as long as the accumulated sum does not exceed .

What is the best possible general upper bound for  if one requires only the continuity of the joint distribution of all variables?  And then, how to compute this bound?

Identically distributed random variables. 

Theorem 1 Let  be identically distributed non-negative random variables with absolutely continuous distribution function . Then

    (2)

where  solves the so-called  BRS-equation

.   (3)  

As an example, here are the answers for the questions posed at the beginning.
The BRS-equation becomes

.  (4)

For the example questions with   this yields .
As one sees from (4), doubling the sample size  and keeping  fixed, or vice versa, yield for the uniform distribution in the non-trivial case the same upper bound.

Generalised BRS-inequality 

Theorem 2. Let  be positive random variables that are jointly distributed such that  has an absolutely continuous distribution function .
If  is defined as before, then

,  (5)

where  is the unique solution of the BRS-equation

  (6)

Clearly, if all random variables
 have the same marginal distribution , then (6) recaptures (3), and (5) recaptures (2).
Again it should be pointed out that
no independence hypothesis whatsoever is needed.

Refinements of the BRS-inequality 

Depending on the type of the distributions , refinements of Theorem 2 can be of true interest. We just mention one of them.

Let  be the random set of those variables one can sum up to yield the maximum random number , that is,
 ,

and let  denote the sum of these variables.
The so-called
residual

is by definition always non-negative, and one has:

Theorem 3. Let  be jointly continuously distributed with marginal distribution functions , and let  be the solution of (6). Then

. (7)

The improvement in (7) compared with (5) therefore consists of 

.

The expected residual in the numerator is typically difficult to compute or estimate, but there exist nice exceptions. For fixed  one can then show that :.

Source 
The first version of the BRS-inequality (Theorem 1) was proved in Lemma 4.1 of F. Thomas Bruss and James B.
Robertson (1991). This paper proves moreover that the upper bound is asymptotically tight if the random variables are independent of each other. The generalisation to arbitrary continuous distributions (Theorem 2) is due to J. Michael Steele (2016). 
Theorem 3 and other refinements of the BRS-inequality are more recent and proved in Bruss (2021).

Applications 
The BRS-inequality is a versatile tool since it applies to many types of problems, and since the computation of the BRS-equation is often not very involved. Also, and in particular, one notes that the maximum number  always dominates the maximum number of selections under any additional constraint, such as e.g. for online selections without recall. Examples studied in Steele (2016) and Bruss (2021) touch many applications, including comparisons between i.i.d. sequences and non-i.i.d. sequences, problems of condensing point processes, “awkward” processes, selection algorithms, knapsack problems, Borel-Cantelli-type problems, the Bruss-Duerinckx theorem, and online Tiling strategies.

References
Bruss F. T. and Robertson J. B. (1991) ’Wald’s Lemma’ for Sums of Order Statistics of i.i.d. Random Variables, Adv. Appl. Probab., Vol. 23, 612-623.

Bruss F. T. and Duerinckx M. (2015),  Resource dependent branching processes and the envelope of societie, Ann. of Appl. Probab., Vol. 25 (1), 324-372.

Steele J.M. (2016),  The Bruss-Robertson Inequality: Elaborations, Extensions, and Applications, Math. Applicanda, Vol. 44, No 1, 3-16.

Bruss F. T. (2021),The BRS-inequality and its applications, Probab. Surveys, Vol.18, 44-76.

Probabilistic inequalities